Gösta Oskar Vilhelm Frykman (11 March 1909 – 26 February 1974) was a Swedish Army officer.

Career
Frykman was born on 11 March 1909 in Vilhelmina, Sweden, the son of chief park ranger (överjägmästare) Dan Frykman and his wife Emy (née Forsgrén). He passed studentexamen in 1929 and became a second lieutenant in Älvsborg Regiment (I 15) in 1933. Frykman attended the Royal Swedish Army Staff College from 1940 to 1942, was press officer at the Defence Staff from 1943 to 1946 and was captain in the General Staff Corps in 1944. In 1946 he served as press officer in the camp staff during the Swedish extradition of Baltic soldiers.

He was military organizer at the defense exhibition in Gävle in 1946 and became major at the Swedish Infantry Combat School in 1954. Frykman was lieutenant colonel at Skaraborg Regiment (P 4) in 1957 and was commander of the Swedish UN battalion in Gaza in 1961 which was part of United Nations Emergency Force. The same year his battalion was redeployed to the Congo during the Congo Crisis where he was commander of the Swedish UN battalion XI G from April 1961 to November 1961.

Other work
Frykman was a member of the inquiry within the Swedish National Board of Information (Statens informationsstyrelse) from 1941 to 1943 and chairman of the board of Fastigheter AB Bergslagen.

Personal life
On 4 April 1936 he married Ingrid Schollin-Borg (1914–2004), the daughter of captain Peter Schollin-Borg and Märtha (née Liedberg). He was the father of Jan Christer (born 1939), Jan Peter (born 1942), Åke (born 1944), Eva (born 1946) and Ingrid (born 1954).

Death
He died on 26 February 1976 in Saltsjöbaden and was buried in Galärvarvskyrkogården in Stockholm.

Awards and decorations
  Knight of the Order of the Sword (1953)
  United Nations Medal

References

1909 births
1974 deaths
Swedish Army colonels
People of the Congo Crisis
People from Vilhelmina Municipality
Knights of the Order of the Sword
Burials at Galärvarvskyrkogården